The Frías I Cabinet constituted the 33rd cabinet of the Republic of Bolivia. It was formed on 28 November 1872 after Tomás Frías was sworn in as the 17th president of Bolivia following the assassination of Agustín Morales, succeeding the Morales Cabinet. It was dissolved on 9 May 1873 upon the end of Frías' mandate and was succeeded by the Cabinet of Adolfo Ballivián.

Composition

History 
Upon his assumption to office, Frías ratified all ministerial portfolios in their present positions. No changes to the cabinet originally formed by Agustín Morales occurred until 27 January 1837 when, due to the resignation of Casimiro Corral, a minor reshuffle took place with Minister of Justice Melchor Terrázas being appointed to replace Corral while Vice President of the Council of State Juan de Dios Bosque was appointed to fill Terrázas' position. Notably, Bosque is the only clergyman to have ever held a ministerial position in Bolivian history.

Cabinets

References

Notes

Footnotes

Bibliography 

 

1872 establishments in Bolivia
1873 disestablishments in Bolivia
Cabinets of Bolivia
Cabinets established in 1872
Cabinets disestablished in 1873